This article lists the winners and nominees for the Black Reel Award for Outstanding Screenplay, Adapted or Original. Geoffrey Fletcher and John Ridley are the only Black Reel Award Screenwriting winners to win Oscars for Best Adapted Screenplay.

Winners and nominees
Winners are listed first and highlighted in bold.

2000s

2010s

2020s

Multiple nominations and wins

Multiple wins
 2 Wins
 Gregory Allen Howard
 Jordan Peele

Multiple nominations

 6 Nominations
 Spike Lee

 5 Nominations
 Tyler Perry

 4 Nominations
 Jordan Peele
 John Ridley

 3 Nominations
 Ryan Coogler
 Michael Elliot
 Steve McQueen
 Gina Prince-Bythewood

 2 Nominations
 Mark Brown
 Ava DuVernay
 Rick Famuyiwa
 Gregory Allen Howard
 Elizabeth Hunter
 Barry Jenkins
 Malcolm D. Lee
 James McBride
 Kemp Powers
 Dee Rees
 Chris Rock
 Don D. Scott
 Kevin Willmott

References

Black Reel Awards